U.N. Academy is a privately owned and regulated higher secondary school in Kokrajhar, Kokrajhar district, Bodoland, Assam. Science and Arts streams are available as options for the students of Higher Secondaries. The medium of instruction is Bodo.

References

Kokrajhar
High schools and secondary schools in Assam
Educational institutions in India with year of establishment missing